Gesa Felicitas Krause (born 3 August 1992) is a German athlete who specialises in the 3000 m steeplechase. She won bronze medals in steeplechase at both the 2015 and 2019 World Championships, and represented Germany at the 2012 and 2016 Olympics. Her personal best for the 3000 m steeplechase is 9:03.30, which is also a national record. In 2019 Krause set a world best for the 2000 m steeplechase in 5:52.80.

Career
In the 2013 European Athletics U23 Championships, she won in a new championship record time of 9:38.91 min. Her greatest achievement to date is the bronze medal at the 2015 World Championships.

Personal bests
 800 m: 2:03.09 min, Pfungstadt, Germany, 6 September 2017
 1000 m: 2:41.59 min, Wehrheim, Germany, 31 July 2011
 1500 m: 4:06.99 min, Stockholm, Sweden, 16 June 2016
 Mile: 4:29.58 min, Oslo, Norway, 9 June 2016
 3000 m: 9:02.04 min, Hengelo, Netherlands, 24 May 2015
 5000 m: 15:24.53 min, Shanghai, China, 13 May 2017
 2000 m Steeplechase: 5:52.80 min, Berlin, Germany, 1 September 2019
 3000 m Steeplechase: 9:03.30 min, Doha, Qatar, 30 September 2019

Achievements

References

External links

 
 
 
 
 
 

1992 births
Living people
People from Lahn-Dill-Kreis
Sportspeople from Giessen (region)
German female steeplechase runners
German female middle-distance runners
Olympic athletes of Germany
Athletes (track and field) at the 2012 Summer Olympics
World Athletics Championships athletes for Germany
World Athletics Championships medalists
Athletes (track and field) at the 2016 Summer Olympics
European Athletics Championships medalists
Athletes (track and field) at the 2020 Summer Olympics
21st-century German women